Raimondi is a district in the middle Atalaya Province in Peru. Part of the Gran Pajonal, an elevated plateau occupied primarily by the Asháninka people. is in Raimondi district.

External links
  Municipalidad Provincial de Atalaya
  Selva amazónicas

Districts of the Atalaya Province
Districts of the Ucayali Region